Solms-Wildenfels was a minor County around Wildenfels in south-western Saxony, Germany. The House of Solms had its origins at Solms, Hesse.

Solms-Wildenfels was a partition of Solms-Baruth. In 1741 it was partitioned between itself and Solms-Sachsenfeld, and reintegrated that County upon its extinction in 1896. Solms-Wildenfels was mediatised to Hesse-Darmstadt in 1806.

Counts of Solms-Wildenfels (1696–1806)
 Otto Henry William (1696–1741)
 Henry Charles (1741–46)
 Frederick Magnus I (1746–1801)
 Frederick Magnus II (1801–06)

Mediatized Counts of Solms-Wildenfels 

 Friedrich Magnus II (1806–1857)
 Friedrich Magnus III (1857-1883)
 Friedrich Magnus IV (1883-1910)
 Friedrich Magnus V (1910-1945), married Princess Marie Antoinette of Schwarzburg, who presumably became the head of the House of Schwarzburg in 1971. Following her brother's death in 1971 in the House of Schwarzburg became extinct in the male line. However the Schwarzburg principalities operated under Semi-Salic primogeniture which means that in the event of the extinction of all male dynasts, as happened with the death of Prince Friedrich Günther, females can inherit.
 Friedrich Magnus VI (1945-) : upon his mother's death in 1984, Friedrich Magnus VI inherited a claim to the headship of the House of Schwarzburg under semi-Salic law.

References 

House of Solms
1696 establishments in the Holy Roman Empire